The following lists events that happened during 2011 in Syria.

Incumbents
President: Bashar al-Assad
Prime Minister: Muhammad Naji al-Otari (until 14 April), Adel Safar (starting 14 April)

Events
For events related to the Civil War, see Timeline of the Syrian Civil War (January–April 2011), Timeline of the Syrian Civil War (May–August 2011) and Timeline of the Syrian Civil War (September–December 2011)

July
Syria al-Shaab satellite broadcast channel is founded.

Deaths

 25 May – Hamza Ali Al-Khateeb, murder victim (born 1997)

References

 
2010s in Syria